The Rolling Stones' 1964 4th British Tour was a concert tour by the band. The tour commenced on September 5 and concluded on October 11, 1964.

The Rolling Stones
Mick Jagger - lead vocals, harmonica, percussion
Keith Richards - guitar, backing vocals
Brian Jones - guitar, harmonica, backing vocals
Bill Wyman - bass guitar, backing vocals
Charlie Watts - drums

Tour set list
"Not Fade Away"
"I Just Want To Make Love To You"
"Walking The Dog"
"If You Need Me"
"Around and Around"
"I'm A King Bee"
"I'm Alright"
"It's All Over Now"

Tour dates
05/09/1964 London, Finsbury Park, Astoria Theatre (2 shows)
06/09/1964 Leicester, Odeon Theatre (2 shows)
08/09/1964 Colchester, Odeon Theatre (2 shows)
09/09/1964 Luton, Odeon Theatre (2 shows)
10/09/1964 Cheltenham, Odeon Theatre (2 shows)
11/09/1964 Cardiff, Wales, Capitol Theatre (2 shows)
13/09/1964 Liverpool, Empire Theatre (2 shows)
14/09/1964 Chester, ABC Theatre (2 shows)
15/09/1964 Manchester, Odeon Theatre (2 shows)
16/09/1964 Wigan, ABC Theatre (2 shows)
17/09/1964 Carlisle, ABC Theatre (2 shows)
18/09/1964 Newcastle upon Tyne, Odeon Theatre (2 shows)
19/09/1964 Edinburgh, Scotland, Usher Hall (2 shows)
20/09/1964 Stockton-on-Tees, ABC Theatre (2 shows)
21/09/1964 Kingston-upon-Hull, ABC Theatre (2 shows)
22/09/1964 Lincoln, ABC Theatre (2 shows)
24/09/1964 Doncaster, Gaumont Theatre (2 shows)
25/09/1964 Hanley, Gaumont Theatre (2 shows)
26/09/1964 Bradford, Gaumont Theatre (2 shows)
27/09/1964 Birmingham, Hippodrome Theatre (2 shows)
28/09/1964 Romford, Odeon Theatre (2 shows)
29/09/1964 Guildford, Odeon Theatre (2 shows)
01/10/1964 Bristol, Colston Hall (2 shows)
02/10/1964 Exeter, Odeon Theatre (2 shows)
03/10/1964 London, Edmonton, Regal Theatre (2 shows)
04/10/1964 Southampton, Gaumont Theatre (2 shows)
05/10/1964 Wolverhampton, Gaumont Theatre (2 shows)
06/10/1964 Watford, Gaumont Theatre (2 shows)
08/10/1964 London, Lewisham, Odeon Theatre (2 shows)
09/10/1964 Ipswich, Gaumont Theatre (2 shows)
10/10/1964 Southend, Odeon Theatre (2 shows)
11/10/1964 Brighton, Hippodrome (2 shows)

References
 Carr, Roy.  The Rolling Stones: An Illustrated Record.  Harmony Books, 1976.  

The Rolling Stones concert tours
1964 concert tours
1964 in the United Kingdom
September 1964 events in the United Kingdom
October 1964 events in the United Kingdom
Concert tours of the United Kingdom